Schoenus (schoinos,  "rush rope"; , "river-measure") was an ancient Egyptian, Greek and Roman unit of length and area based on the knotted cords first used in Egyptian surveying.

Length
The Greeks, who adopted it from the Egyptians, generally considered the schoinos equal to 40 stades, but neither the schoinos nor the stadion had an absolute value, and there were several regional variants of each. This agrees with the distance implied by the Triacontaschoenus stretching south of the First Cataract in Roman-era Nubia. Pliny the Elder 5.11 that is 30 stadia. Strabo  17.1.24: according to the place, between 30 and 120 stadia. Isidore of Charax's schoenus—used in his Parthian Stations—has been given values between 4.7 and 5.5 kilometers, but the precise value remains controversial given the known errors in some of his distances.

Area
The Romans also used the schoenus as a unit of area, equivalent to the actus quadratus or half-jugerum (2523 m²) formed by a square with sides of 120 Roman feet. The Heraclean Tables admonished that each schoenus should be planted with 4 olive trees and some grape vines, upon penalty of fines.

See also
 Egyptian, Greek, and Roman units
 Rope and knot, related units
 Knotted cord, the surveying tool initially responsible for the schoenus

References

Obsolete units of measurement
Units of length
Ancient Greek units of measurement